USADSB is the second studio album by Danish rock band Nephew. Released in Denmark on June 30, 2004, it was met tremendously positively by both critics and the public; after less than a month, on July 24, sales of USADSB had reached 20,000, landing Nephew a gold album.

The title is a combination of United States (United States of America) and DSB (Danske Statsbaner — Danish State Railways), mirroring the lyrical content's mix of Danish and English.

Track listing 

"Movie Klip" - 5:03
"Superliga" - 3:42
"Blå & Black" - 3:29
"Milk & Wine" - 4:17
"Dårlig Træning" - 5:19
"En Wannabe Darth Vader" - 4:20
"Worst/Best Case Scenario" - 4:26
"Ordenspoliti" - 4:47
"USA DSB" - 3:50
"Bazooka" - 5:59
"A Wannabe Darth Vader" (Bonus Track- English Version of "En Wannabe Darth Vader") - 3:49

References

2004 albums
Nephew (band) albums